Moctar Mohamed Cissé (born 10 March 1993) is a Mali international footballer who is playing for US Biskra. He previously played for Malian clubs AS Real Bamako and Stade Malien and for Moroccan clubs Wydad Casablanca and AS Salé. He has represented his country at under-23 and senior level.

Club career
Playing for AS Real Bamako, Cissé finished the 2013–14 season as Malian Première Division joint top scorer, with 15 goals. His goal in the away leg against Enyimba helped his club proceed to the second qualifying round of the 2014 CAF Champions League on away goals., Although Real lost in that round, they were able to qualify for the 2014 CAF Confederation Cup group stage.

Cissé signed for Malian champions Stade Malien for the new season. He played and scored for them in the 2015 CAF Champions League, and, as in the previous season, failed to reach the main competition but qualified for the Confederation Cup group stage.

He moved on to reigning Moroccan champions Wydad Casablanca ahead of the 2015–16 season. He scored twice in the second match of the season in a 3–1 defeat of 2015 runners-up Olympique Club de Khouribga. After some confusion about his destination, Cissé spent the second half of the season on loan at AS Salé of the Moroccan second tier.

He joined Albanian Superliga club KF Tirana ahead of the 2016–17 season, signing a two-year contract. However, Wydad Casablanca claimed he was still under contract to them. The player appealed to FIFA, who ruled that he was free to play for KF Tirana, and he finally made his debut on 16 October in a 2–1 win against Skënderbeu.

International career
Cissé has represented his country in the qualification process for the 2015 Africa U-23 Cup of Nations, which doubled as qualifiers for the 2016 Olympics, and, at senior level, in the 2016 CHAN qualifiers.

Honours

Tirana
 Albanian Cup (1): 2016–17

References

External links

1993 births
Living people
Sportspeople from Bamako
Malian footballers
Mali international footballers
Association football forwards
AS Real Bamako players
Stade Malien players
Wydad AC players
Association Salé players
KF Tirana players
CS Constantine players
NA Hussein Dey players
Al-Ain FC (Saudi Arabia) players
Botola players
Kategoria Superiore players
Algerian Ligue Professionnelle 1 players
Saudi First Division League players
Malian expatriate footballers
Expatriate footballers in Morocco
Expatriate footballers in Albania
Expatriate footballers in Algeria
Expatriate footballers in Saudi Arabia
Malian expatriate sportspeople in Morocco
Malian expatriate sportspeople in Albania
Malian expatriate sportspeople in Algeria
Malian expatriate sportspeople in Saudi Arabia
21st-century Malian people
Mali A' international footballers
2022 African Nations Championship players